Nigel Maister is the Russell and Ruth Peck Artistic Director of the University of Rochester's International Theater Program and has been the director of the theater program since 2002. In addition to his work in theater at the University, he is also a librettist, a founding member and staging director for the ensemble Alarm Will Sound, as well as a noted collector of vernacular photography.

External links
UR Institute for Performing Arts Youtube Channel, featuring several interviews with Maister

References

Living people
American theatre directors
Artistic directors
University of Rochester faculty
20th-century American writers
21st-century American writers
Carnegie Mellon University alumni
Year of birth missing (living people)